Constructorul Galați was a football team from Galați, Galați County, Romania.

History

Constructorul Galați was a small team, with many names along the history. They never played in the first league of Romanian football. They wrote history in the 1972–73 Cupa României when they played the final as a Divizia C team after they eliminated Steaua București and Dinamo București, the two most important teams in Romanian football, but they lost "The final of the poor" in front of Divizia B team Chimia Râmnicu Vâlcea .
The 1972–73 season was the most successful season in the club's history because it was also the season they won their series from the third league of Romanian football, which gained them the promotion to the second one.
In 1975, Constructorul Galați moved in Tecuci, becoming Victoria Tecuci.

Chronology of names

Performances
Cupa României
Finalist (1): 1972–73

Divizia C
Champion (1): 1972–73

References

External links
romaniansoccer.ro

Association football clubs established in 1950
Association football clubs disestablished in 1975
Defunct football clubs in Romania
Football clubs in Galați County
Liga I clubs
Liga II clubs
Galați
1950 establishments in Romania